Raffaella Reggi and Sergio Casal were the defending champions but did not turn up in the semifinals to play Martina Navratilova and Emilio Sánchez.

Navratilova and Sánchez won in the final 6–4, 6–7(6–8), 7–6(14–12) against Betsy Nagelsen and Paul Annacone. With this win, Navratilova became only the 2nd woman in the open era after Billie Jean King to win the 'Triple Crown' i.e. Winning the singles, doubles and mixed doubles title at the same event.

Seeds
Champion seeds are indicated in bold text while text in italics indicates the round in which those seeds were eliminated.

Draw

Final

Top half

Bottom half

References
1987 US Open – Doubles draws and results at the International Tennis Federation

Mixed Doubles
US Open (tennis) by year – Mixed doubles